The 1988 Windsor municipal election was held in the City of Windsor, Ontario to elect a mayor, councillors and school trustees.

Results

Bob Girard was a veteran community and environmental activist in Windsor.  He was a member of Surrounding Citizens Reacting Against Pollution (SCRAP) during the 1980s, and opposed the environmental practices of the Zalev Brothers scrapyard. He was also involved in a campaign to shut down CP Rail's illegal Powell Siding, and was a returning officer for Windsor—Walkerville in the 1987 and 1990 provincial elections. He managed a tree nursery in private life, and wrote occasional newspaper articles on horticultural matters. He ran for council in 1974 and 1988, and suggested that his 1988 loss was due to rival candidate Dwight Duncan's connections to the local Liberal Party organisation. Girard died on 19 September 1993 of an apparent heart attack while playing golf.  He was fifty-five years old.
Gerald Johnson did not provide biographical information to the Windsor Star newspaper. He was forbidden from participating in the 1991 election, after failing to file his expenses and income statements.

Footnotes

1988 elections in Canada
Municipal elections in Windsor, Ontario
1988 in Ontario